Nadvornikia is a genus of lichenized fungi in the family Thelotremataceae.

The genus name of Nadvornikia is in honour of Josef Nádvorník (1906–1977), who was a Czech lichenologist. He was an authority on lichens of the order Caliciales and, in particular, the genus Physcia..

The genus was circumscribed by Leif Tibell in Beih. Nova Hedwigia vol.79 on pages 672 and 710 in 1984.

Genera
As accepted by the GBIF;
 Nadvornikia expallescens 
 Nadvornikia hawaiensis 
 Nadvornikia peninsulae 
 Nadvornikia sorediata

References

Ostropales
Lichen genera
Ostropales genera
Taxa named by Leif Tibell